The 2022 FIBA U16 European Championship Division C was the 16th edition of the Division C of the FIBA U16 European Championship, the third tier of the European under-16 basketball championship. It was played from 12 to 17 July 2022 in Prizren, Kosovo. Andorra men's national under-16 basketball team won the tournament.

Participating teams

  (24th place, 2019 FIBA U16 European Championship Division B)

First round
The draw of the first round was held on 15 February 2022 in Freising, Germany.

In the first round, the teams were drawn into two groups of four. The first two teams from each group advance to the semifinals; the other teams will play in the 5th–8th place playoffs.

Group A

Group B

5th−8th place playoffs

5th−8th place semifinals

7th place match

5th place match

Championship playoffs

Semifinals

3rd place match

Final

Final standings

References

External links
 Official website

FIBA U16 European Championship Division C
2022–23 in European basketball
FIBA U16
FIBA
International youth basketball competitions hosted by Kosovo
Sport in Prizren